Cheongnyeongnopo is a dong, or precinct, in Geumjeong-gu, Busan, South Korea.  It was created in 1998 when the former districts Cheongnyeong-dong and Nopo-dong were amalgamated.

See also
Geography of South Korea
Administrative divisions of South Korea

References

Geumjeong District
Neighbourhoods in South Korea
Populated places established in 1998
1998 establishments in South Korea